Wayland Hoyt (February 18, 1838 – September 27, 1910) was an American Baptist minister and author.

Early life and education
Born on February 18, 1838, in Cleveland, Ohio. He was born the oldest son of Mary Ella Beebee Hoyt and Dr. James Hoyt, a Baptist minister, lawyer, businessman and author. Wayland was one of six children. One of his brothers, Colgate, was in business with his father and another, Elton, practiced law.

Hoyt graduated from Brown University in 1860 and from Rochester Theological Seminary in 1863.

Ministry
He was ordained in Pittsfield, Massachusetts, at a Baptist church. The following year he became pastor of the Ninth Street Baptist Church in Cincinnati, Ohio.

In 1867 he moved to Brooklyn where he became minister of the Strong Place Baptist Church. The church, described as a "large and influential church", was where Hoyt "began the development of his powers as a profound thinker, a scholarly writer, and an able preacher." Hoyt left the Strong Place church and was briefly the minister at the Tabernacle Baptist Church in New York and then the Shawmut Baptist Church in Boston. He then returned to Strong Place in Brooklyn.

In July, 1882, he succeeded Dr. Henson at Memorial, Philadelphia. Seven years later, in December, 1889, he moved to Minneapolis.

He thereafter returned to Philadelphia to accept a call to Epiphany. At the Memorial Church in eight years he baptized 319 converts, the chapel was remodeled at a cost of $8,966. Hoyt developed a widespread reputation as a preacher.

American Baptist Church

Hoyt was one of the managers of the American Baptist Publication Society and served on the Missionary, Publication and Bible Committees. He was a manager on the American Baptist Missionary Union in 1899.

Hoyt delivered addresses to young ministers and the Ministers' Union of the American Baptist Church.

Causes
Among the causes to which he dedicated himself were the education of freed slaves and their descendants, following the Civil War; the expanding of missions to Native Americans and to Mexico, and the prohibition of liquor.

Publications

Sermons and articles
Many of Hoyts sermons and articles were published in newspapers, such as the ''New York Times, or in books or journals.

Books
The following is a partial list of Hoyt's publications:

Death
He died at Salem, Massachusetts.

References

Further reading

External links
 

1838 births
1910 deaths
American Protestant ministers and clergy
Religious leaders from Cleveland
Colgate Rochester Crozer Divinity School alumni